is a Japanese company that manufactures disposable hygiene products, household cleaning products, specializing in the manufacture of diapers for both babies and adult incontinence, feminine hygiene products and pet care products.

The company has operations in 80 countries and is a market leader in Asia in baby and feminine care products. It holds the top share of diaper sales in China, India, Indonesia, Vietnam and Thailand. Also its market share is rapidly expanding in India, nearly doubling its sales every two years.

History
Unicharm traces its roots to the Taisei Kako Co., Ltd., founded by Keiichiro Takahara. Takahara's family operated a paper manufacturing business in Shikoku. After resigning in 1961 from his father's paper manufacturing company, he founded his own, Taisei Kako (Taisei Chemical Works). He then turned his attention to the manufacture and sale of selling wood wool cement board. Then the company in 1963 ventured to manufacture and sell sanitary napkins. The company then started selling tampons in 1974, when Unicharm Corporation was founded to separate the feminine care production from the main company.

Operations

The company has a number of prominent brands in its portfolio, including MamyPoko, Charm, Moony, BabyJoy, Babylove, Sofy and Lifree, Teemo. In December 2011, Unicharm acquired 51% ownership of pet products maker Hartz Mountain Corporation from Sumitomo Corporation.

References

External links

 

Manufacturing companies based in Tokyo
Manufacturing companies established in 1961
Japanese companies established in 1961
Companies listed on the Tokyo Stock Exchange
Chemical companies based in Tokyo
Pulp and paper companies of Japan
Personal care companies
Mitsubishi
Japanese brands
1980s initial public offerings